The 1959 Arizona Wildcats baseball team represented the University of Arizona in the 1959 NCAA University Division baseball season. The Wildcats played their home games at UA Field and Hi Corbett Field in Tucson, Arizona. The team was coached by Frank Sancet in his ninth season at Arizona.

The Wildcats reached the College World Series, finishing as the runner up to Oklahoma State.

Roster

Schedule

References 

Arizona
Arizona Wildcats baseball seasons
College World Series seasons
Arizona Baseball
Border Conference baseball champion seasons